Andrew W. Herrmann is an American civil engineer who is a principal emeritus at engineering firm Hardesty & Hanover after serving with the firm for 40 years. He was president of the American Society of Civil Engineers in 2012.

He received his bachelor's degree in civil engineering from Valparaiso University, Indiana, and his master's degree from the Polytechnic Institute of New York. Hermann is an expert on the construction of bridges and has testified before the U.S. Congress regarding their safety.

References

	

Year of birth missing (living people)
Living people
Valparaiso University alumni
Polytechnic Institute of New York University alumni
American civil engineers